Dodge Point Preserve is a state-owned conservation area in Newcastle, Maine. Public facilities include hiking trails and a dock. The preserve was established in 1989, and is managed by a partnership between the state and the Damariscotta River Association.

Features
The preserve is located in southern Newcastle, with River Road passing through the western third of the property. A parking area and trailhead with informational kiosk is located at the road's northern entry into the reserve. The landscape is dominated by red pine, dating to the land's use as a tree farm, and still subject to occasional harvest by the state. Near the northern boundary lies Ice Pond, a site historically used for ice harvesting. One section of the shoreline is called Brickyard Beach, for the large number of bricks and brickmaking detritus found there, left from 18th and 19th-century brickmaking operations.

History
The preserve's land has seen human activity since prehistoric times; at least one prehistoric archaeological site (now listed on the National Register of Historic Places has been found there.  In the 19th century, the land was cleared for farming, resulting in the creation of the stone walls found throughout the property.  In the 20th century, the property was used as a tree farm prior to its acquisition by the state in 1989.

See also
National Register of Historic Places listings in Lincoln County, Maine

References

Protected areas of Lincoln County, Maine
Protected areas established in 1989
Archaeological sites on the National Register of Historic Places in Maine
National Register of Historic Places in Lincoln County, Maine